The Roland AX-7 is a keytar that was manufactured by Roland Corporation from 2001 to 2007. This modern instrument contains many more advanced features than early keytars such as its predecessor, the Roland AX-1, and the Yamaha SHS-10. It runs on 6 AA batteries or an external power source. It has a 45 velocity sensitive keys (without aftertouch), and a 3-character LED display. Several features aimed towards stage performance are present, such as a pitch bend ribbon, touchpad-like expression bar, sustain switch, and volume control knob, all on the upper neck of the instrument. There is also a proprietary "D-Beam" interface, made up of infrared sensors that detect nearby motion.

In 2007 the Roland AX-7 was discontinued and is succeeded by the Roland AX-Synth since 2009.

MIDI functionality 
This instrument functions as a MIDI controller; it produces MIDI messages that are sent to an external synthesizer or sound module. (Thus it produces no sound on its own.) It is fully compatible with General MIDI, General MIDI Level 2, and Roland's own GS MIDI implementation. It has both MIDI in and out ports, and can store up to 128 patches.

Popular opinion

The overall opinion of the Roland AX-7 is consistent.  Several reviewers have said that the AX-7 excels in features, like the D-beam and volume knob. It also has good scores in reliability and sounds, even though it has no voices of its own programmed onto the keytar.  However, some said that it lacks in ease of use and customer support.  Some said that the user’s manual is too confusing for more lighthearted synth users, and the customer support knows almost nothing about the product.  Nearly every review on one site agrees with that, but the overall review, out of 10, is a 9.2. 
On another site the users all agree that it is a valuable keytar; they all gave it 4-5 out of 5 stars and thought that the AX-7 was an excellent keytar.

Notable players
Tim Blake of the space rock band Hawkwind
Herbie Hancock
Vadim Pruzhanov of the power metal band DragonForce.
Henrik Klingenberg of the power metal band Sonata Arctica. (Also Roland AX-1 and AX-Synth)
Victoria Asher of the band Cobra Starship.
Christopher Bowes of the Pirate Metal band Alestorm.
Robert Lamm of the rock band Chicago (band).
Donald Fagen of the rock band Steely Dan.  He also won a Grammy award.
Adam Wakeman, a keytarist for Ozzy Osbourne
Beresford Romeo, from Soul II Soul
Chick Corea
Chris Marion, from Little River Band
Daisuke Asakura, a Japanese pop artist
Andy Qunta, from Icehouse
David A. Stewart, a BRIT award winning artist
David Britton, founder of Weird Fantasy
Pablo Lescano, founder, keytarist and singer of Damas Gratis
Didier Marouani, a French composer
En Esch, from KMFDM and Slick Idiot
Simon Kvamm, from the Danish band Nephew
A.R. Rahman, Indian composer and Academy Award winner for Slumdog Millionaire
Joe Felix, from The Mix. plays it connected to a Kenton MidiStream Wireless Midi System
Steve Etherington, producer, composer, session multi-instrumentalist, and Rubettes member
Dustin Diesing

See also 
 Roland AX-1
 Roland AX-Synth

References

External links 

 Official Roland AX-7 website

Keytars
Roland Keytars
MIDI controllers
Digital synthesizers